The Korean language has two regularly used sets of numerals: a native Korean system and Sino-Korean system. The native Korean number system is used for general counting, like counting up to 99. It is also used to count people, hours, objects, ages, and more. Sino-Korean numbers on the other hand are used for purposes such as dates, money, minutes, addresses, phone numbers, and numbers above 100.

Construction
For both native and Sino- Korean numerals, the teens (11 through 19) are represented by a combination of tens and the ones places.  For instance, 15 would be sib-o, but not usually il-sib-o in the Sino-Korean system, and yeol-daseot in native Korean. Twenty through ninety are likewise represented in this place-holding manner in the Sino-Korean system, while Native Korean has its own unique set of words, as can be seen in the chart below. The grouping of large numbers in Korean follows the Chinese tradition of myriads (10000) rather than thousands (1000).  The Sino-Korean system is nearly entirely based on the Chinese numerals.

The distinction between the two numeral systems is very important.  Everything that can be counted will use one of the two systems, but seldom both.  Sino-Korean words are sometimes used to mark ordinal usage: yeol beon means "ten times" while sip beon means "number ten."

When denoting the age of a person, one will usually use sal for the native Korean numerals, and se for Sino-Korean. For example, seumul-daseot sal and i-sib-o se both mean 'twenty-five-year-old'. See also East Asian age reckoning.

The Sino-Korean numerals are used to denote the minute of time. For example, sam-sib-o bun means "__:35" or "thirty-five minutes."
The native Korean numerals are used for the hours in the 12-hour system and for the hours 0:00 to 12:00 in the 24-hour system. The hours 13:00 to 24:00 in the 24-hour system are denoted using both the native Korean numerals and the Sino-Korean numerals. For example, se si means '03:00' or '3:00 a.m./p.m.' and sip-chil si or yeol-ilgop si means '17:00'.

Some of the native numbers take a different form in front of measure words:

The descriptive forms for 1, 2, 3, 4, and 20 are formed by "dropping the last letter" from the original native cardinal, so to speak. Examples:
 han beon ("once")
 du gae ("two things")
 se si ("three o'clock"), in contrast, in North Korea the Sino-Korean numeral  "sam" would normally be used; making it  "sam si"
 ne myeong ("four people")
 seumu mari ("twenty animals")

Something similar also occurs in some Sino-Korean cardinals:
 onyuwol ("May and June")
 yuwol ("June")
 siwol ("October")

The cardinals for three and four have alternative forms in front of some measure words:
 seok dal ("three months")
 neok jan ("four cups")

Korean has several words formed with two or three consecutive numbers. Some of them have irregular or alternative forms.
한둘 handul ("one or two") / 한두 handu ("one or two" in front of measure words)
두셋 duset ("two or three") / 두세 duse ("two or three" in front of measure words)
서넛 seoneot ("three or four") / 서너 seoneo ("three or four" in front of measure words)
두서넛 duseoneot ("two or three or four") / 두서너 duseoneo ("two or three or four" in front of measure words)
너덧 neodeot, 네댓 nedaet, 네다섯 nedaseot, 너더댓 neodeodaet ("four or five")
대여섯 daeyeoseot, 대엿 daeyeot ("five or six")
예닐곱 yenilgop ("six or seven")
일고여덟 ilgoyeodeol, 일여덟 ilyeodeol ("seven or eight")
여덟아홉 yeodeolahop, 엳아홉 yeotahop ("eight or nine")

As for counting days in native Korean, another set of unique words are used:
하루 haru ("one day")
이틀 iteul ("two days")
사흘 saheul ("three days")
사나흘 sanaheul, 사날 sanal ("three or four days")
나흘 naheul ("four days")
네댓새 nedaessae, 너댓새 neodaessae, 너더댓새 neodeodaessae, 나달 nadal ("four or five days")
닷새 dassae ("five days")
대엿새 daeyeossae ("five or six days")
엿새 yeossae ("six days")
예니레 yenire ("six or seven days")
이레 ire ("seven days")
일여드레 ilyeodeure ("seven or eight days")
여드레 yeodeure ("eight days")
아흐레 aheure ("nine days")
열흘 yeolheul ("ten days")
The native Korean saheul (사흘; three days) is often misunderstood as the Sino-Korean sail (사일; 四日; four days) due to similar sounds. The two words are different in origin and have different meanings.

Cardinal numerals

Pronunciation
Thus for example:
 yeol-dul (twelve) is pronounced like  yeol-ttul
 yeodeol-gwon (eight (books)) is pronounced like  yeodeol-kkwon

The usual liaison and consonant-tensing rules apply, so for example,  yesun-yeoseot (sixty-six) is pronounced like  (yesun-nyeoseot) and  chil-sip (seventy) is pronounced like  chil-ssip.

Constant suffixes used in Sino-Korean ordinal numerals
Beon, ho, cha, and hoe are always used with Sino-Korean or Arabic ordinal numerals. For example, Yihoseon is Line Number Two in a metropolitan subway system. Samsipchilbeongukdo is highway number 37. They cannot be used interchangeably.

 is 'Apt #906' in a mailing address. 906 without ho is not used in spoken Korean to imply apartment number or office suite number. The special prefix je is usually used in combination with suffixes to designate a specific event in sequential things such as the Olympics.

Substitution for disambiguation
In commerce or the financial sector, some hanja for each Sino-Korean numbers are replaced by alternative ones to prevent ambiguity or retouching. 

For verbally communicating number sequences such as phone numbers, ID numbers, etc., especially over the phone, native Korean numbers for 1 and 2 are sometimes substituted for the Sino-Korean numbers. For example, o-o-o hana-dul-hana-dul instead of o-o-o il-i-il-i for '555-1212', or sa-o-i-hana instead of sa-o-i-il for '4521', because of the potential confusion between the two similar-sounding Sino-Korean numbers.

For the same reason, military transmissions are known to use mixed native Korean and Sino-Korean numerals:

Notes
 Note 1:  Korean assimilation rules apply as if the underlying form were  |sip.ryuk|, giving sim-nyuk instead of the expected sib-yuk.
 Note 2:  These names are considered archaic, and are not used.
 Note 3:  The numbers higher than 1020 (hae) are not usually used.
 Note 4:  The names for these numbers are from Buddhist texts; they are not usually used. Dictionaries sometimes disagree on which numbers the names represent.

References
 J.J. Song The Korean language: Structure, Use and Context (2005 Routledge) pp. 81ff.

See also
Korean language
Korean count word

Korean language
Numerals